The American cooking series Southern at Heart aired on Food Network from 2013 to 2016. 53 episodes of the series aired over five seasons.

Episodes

Season 1 (2013)

Season 2 (2014)

Season 3 (2014)

Season 4 (2015)

Season 5 (2015–2016)

References

External links
 
 

Lists of American non-fiction television series episodes
Lists of food television series episodes